Viorel Morariu (18 October 1931 – 23 May 2017) was a former Romanian rugby union flanker. He was one of the best Romanian rugby players of his generation.

His son Octavian Morariu became president of the Romanian Rugby Federation (F.R.R).

International career 
Morariu was a consistent member of the Romanian national team throughout the 1950s and 1960s and was a former captain of the team.

Awards 
In 2012, he received the Vernon Pugh Award for Distinguished Service.

Death 
Viorel Morariu died on 23 May 2017.

See also
 List of Romania national rugby union players

References

External links 
 
 Obituary of Viorel Morariu, Romanian Rugby Federation 

Romanian rugby union players
1931 births
2017 deaths
Romania international rugby union players
Rugby union flankers
Presidents of the Romanian Rugby Federation